The Battle of Krivolak (in , Битка при Криволак) was a World War I battle, fought between 21 October and 22 November 1915. The battle was fought in the initial stage of the Macedonian campaign, in the Balkans Theatre. On October 21, Bulgarian troops attacked the French-held positions near the Strumica rail station, at the time part of the Kingdom of Serbia (present day North Macedonia), starting the battle. Fighting continued until November 22, when two Serbian divisions failed to capture Skopje, thus rendering the continuation of Entente offensive operations dangerous and forcing the French to evacuate their forces from the region.

The Entente defeat at Krivolak and the follow–up battle of Kosturino led to the complete withdrawal of Allied forces from Serbia, thus enabling the Central Powers to re-open the Berlin to Constantinople rail line. The Allies in the meantime consolidated their defenses in Greece.

Prelude

The 28 June 1914, assassination of Austro-Hungarian heir presumptive Archduke Franz Ferdinand precipitated Austria-Hungary's declaration of war against Serbia. The conflict quickly attracted the involvement of all major European countries, pitting the Central Powers against the Entente coalition and starting World War I. After the entry of the Ottoman Empire into the war on the side of the Central Powers (November 1914), the decisive factor in the Balkans became the attitude of Bulgaria. Bulgaria occupied a strategically important position on the Serbian flank and its intervention on either side of the belligerents would be decisive. Bulgaria and Serbia had fought each other twice in the previous thirty years: in the Serbo-Bulgarian War of 1885 and in the Second Balkan War of 1913. Bulgaria had suffered defeat in 1913 and the Bulgarian government and people generally felt that Serbia had stolen land which rightfully belonged to Bulgaria. While the Allies could only offer Bulgaria small territorial concessions from Serbia and neutral Greece, the Central Powers' promises appeared far more enticing, as they offered to cede most of the land which Bulgaria claimed. With the Allied defeats at the Battle of Gallipoli (April 1915 to January 1916) and the Russian defeat at Gorlice-Tarnów (May to September 1915) demonstrating the Central Powers' strength, King Ferdinand signed a treaty with Germany and on September 21, 1915 Bulgaria began mobilizing for war.

After the victory of the Serbian army in the Battle of Kolubara in December 1914, the Serbian front saw a lull until the early autumn of 1915. Under the command of Field Marshal August von Mackensen, the Austro-Hungarian Balkan Army, the German 11th Army and river flotillas on the Danube and the Sava began an offensive on 6 October 1915, the largest offensive against Serbia. By September 1915, despite the extreme sacrifice of the Serbian army, the Austro-Hungarian Balkan Army, having crossed the rivers Sava and Drina and the German 11th Army after crossing the Danube, occupied Belgrade, Smederevo, Požarevac and Golubac, creating a wide bridgehead south of the Sava and Danube rivers, and forcing Serbian forces to withdraw to southern Serbia. On 15 October 1915, two Bulgarian armies attacked, overrunning Serbian units, penetrating into the valley of the South Morava river near Vranje up to 22 October 1915. The Bulgarian forces occupied Kumanovo, Štip, and Skopje, and prevented the withdrawal of the Serbian army to the Greek border and Salonika.

For a year, the Allies had repeatedly promised to send serious military forces to Serbia, while nothing had materialized. But with Bulgaria's mobilization to its south, the situation for Serbia became desperate. The developments finally forced the French and the British to decide upon sending a small expedition force of two divisions to help Serbia, but even these arrived too late in the Greek port of Salonika to have any impact in the operations. The main reason for the delay was the lack of available Allied forces due to the critical situation in the Western Front. The Entente used Greek neutrality as an excuse, although they could have used the Albanian coast for a rapid deployment of reinforcements and equipment during the first 14 months of the war. (As the Serbian Marshal Putnik had suggested, the Montenegrin army gave adequate cover to the Albanian coast from the north—at a safe distance from any Bulgarian advance in the south in the event of a Bulgarian intervention.) The Entente also delayed due to protracted secret negotiations aiming at bringing Bulgaria into the Allied camp, which event would have alleviated Serbia's need for Franco-British help.

In the event the lack of Allied support sealed the fate of the Serbian Army. Against Serbia the Central Powers marshaled the Bulgarian Army, a German Army, and an Austro-Hungarian Army, all under the command of Field Marshal Mackensen. The Germans and Austro-Hungarians began their attack on 7 October with a massive artillery barrage, followed by attacks across the rivers. Then, on 11 October the Bulgarian Army attacked from two directions, one from the north of Bulgaria towards Niš, the other from the south towards Skopje. The Bulgarian Army rapidly broke through the weaker Serbian forces which tried to block its advance. With the Bulgarian breakthrough, the Serbian position became hopeless; their main army in the north faced either encirclement and enforced surrender, or retreat.

Marshal Putnik ordered a full Serbian retreat, southwards and westwards through Montenegro and into Albania. The Serbs faced great difficulties: terrible weather, poor roads and the need for the army to help the tens of thousands of civilians who retreated with them. Only  soldiers managed to reach the Adriatic coast and embark on Italian transport ships, that carried the army to Corfu and other Greek islands before it traveled on to Thessaloniki. Marshal Putnik had to be carried during the whole retreat; he died just over a year later in a French hospital.

Battle

The French and British divisions marched north from Thessaloniki in October 1915 under the joint command of the French General Maurice Sarrail, and British General Bryan Mahon. From the 15–16 October, the French 57th, 122nd and 156th divisions, including two regiments of Chasseurs d'Afrique and a regiment of Zouaves, reached the Gevgelija and Strumica rail stations. On 20 October, the French divisions reached Krivolak on the Vardar river, while the British occupied the strategically important area between the Kosturino Pass, Vardar and lake Doiran. This advance aided the retreating Serbian army, as the Bulgarians had to concentrate larger forces on their southern flank, to deal with a possible invasion into their territory. The French command then became aware of the Bulgarian presence in the Babuna Pass between Veles and Bitola and attempted to reach a group of Serbian soldiers located northwest of the pass.

On 21 October, the 14th Bulgarian Regiment moved down from Strumica towards the Strumica rail station aiming at destroying a nearby railway bridge and unexpectedly encountered a French force. By the 24 October, the 2nd Bulgarian Army under Generals Georgi Todorov and Stefan Bogdanov had seized Veles and Kumanovo, cutting off the bulk of the retreating Serbs from the French. By the 27 October, the 57th Division had established a semi–circular bridgehead around Karahojali east of the Vardar, covering a  line between Gradec and Krivolak. On 2 November, two flying bridges were thrown over the Vardar, facilitating the supply of the new positions. On 3 November, a French detachment thwarted an attempt by three Bulgarian brigades to storm the bridges. Lacking in training and adequate cover, the Bulgarian infantry mowed down as they charged, resulting in 3,000 casualties. On the same day, the 156th Division captured the villages of Dorlobos and Kajali.

Finding the terrain to be impracticable for field artillery, the 57th and 122nd Divisions abandoned it at Karahojali, instead advancing towards Veles, to strike the Bulgarian rear. On 5 November Kamen Dol, Debrista and the Gradsko rail station fell into French hands. The push ended on 7 November, when the two divisions were repelled near the Monastery of Archangel, a Bulgarian stronghold. On 6 November, the 156th Division launched an attack on Fortin Bulgare and Hill 526, south of Kosturino. The assault failed, with a Bulgarian counterattack securing Dorlobos. On 9 November, Sirkovo and Krusevica were occupied by the French. Around the same time the Bulgarian command shifted their attention from pursuing the retreating Serbians to combating the French forces. The 156th Division was facing mount Belasica while covering the Vardar valley up to Gradec. Two regiments of the 57th Division held the railway from Gradec to Karahojali. The 122nd Division and two regiments of the 57th Division were in control of the territory from Gradsko station to the Vozarci bridgehead on the left bank of the Crna river, faced by six Bulgarian regiments.

On 10 November, the French charge on the Monastery of Archangel was met with an almost simultaneous Bulgarian counter-attack. The monastery was held but the French seized the nearby Dolno Cicevo and Gorno Cicevo villages, the latter on the evening of the following day. On 11 November, a second French attack on Fortin Bulgare and Hill 526, fared better, capturing the two positions and forcing the Bulgarian batteries on the Kosturino–Strumica road to fall back. On the night of the 11 November, General Charles de Lardemelle commanding the 122nd Division evacuated the two Cicevos. On the morning of the 12 November, General Stefan Bogdanov ordered an offensive on Mrzen, Gradsko and the two Cicevos, believing that they were still occupied by the Allies, by the afternoon Krusevica and Grasko had been conquered by the Bulgarians. To the west, the French reached the outskirts of Ormanli and Kosturino, halting after receiving news of Bulgarian reinforcements at Mount Belasica. On 13 November, a renewed Bulgarian attack made limited gains on both flanks of the front. General Sarrail was then ordered by the French government to halt all operations and fall back to Bitola, due to the hostility of some Greek officials, which dangerously exposed the French rear to a potential Greek attack.

The front remained quiet until the 20 November, when the 5th Bulgarian Division moved down the Prilep–Vozarci road, capturing the Vozarci bridgehead. On 22 November, two Serbian divisions launched an abortive assault on Skopje and the Serbian defeat removed the need for further Entente offensives in Vardar Macedonia, enabling the French to evacuate their forces from the region. The battle resulted in a total of 5,877 Bulgarians killed, wounded or missing. French losses amounted to 3,161 killed, wounded or missing.

Aftermath

The British had in the meantime only encountered small bands of Bulgarian deserters, who informed them that the 2nd Bulgarian Army under General Georgi Todorov had been reinforced at Strumica. On 26 November, the French forces that were previously in touch with the British at the Kajali ravine began their evacuation, dangerously exposing the left flank of the 10th (Irish) Division. Expecting Greece to remain inert, Bulgaria was now able to launch a fresh offensive with its 120 battalions against the 50 that the Allies had in their disposal. On the morning of the 4 December, the Bulgarians built trestle bridges across the Crna river and rapidly occupied Bitola.

On 4 December, Bulgaria commenced an artillery barrage on British positions along the Kosturino ridge, the artillery preparation continued until the 6 December, when it was augmented. The bombardment reached its peak at 2:30 p.m., while concentrating on the Rocky Peak position south of Ormanli which was held by the Connaught Rangers. Rocky Peak was briefly overrun by the Bulgarians before the Royal Irish Fusiliers drove them back in hand-to-hand fighting. At dusk the Rocky Peak was reinforced by half a company and a machine gun, the 6th Royal Dublin Fusiliers were transferred to Kajali, with three additional companies heading towards Hasanli.

At 1:00 p.m. on 11 December, the 11th Bulgarian Division seized Bogdanci, cutting the local telephone line and capturing an ammunition depot. The Allies had selected the Doiran train station as their new objective, in preparation of a complete evacuation towards Salonika. The 9th Battalion King's Own Royal Regiment remained isolated from the rest of Allies, only beginning its withdrawal at 12:45 a.m. on 12 December. An hour later the battalion encountered a battalion of soldiers resting by the roadside, belatedly realising that they were Bulgarians. The resulting bayonet charge led to the death or capture of 122 British soldiers. By evening, the evacuation of the Entente troops into Greece was complete, with the 10th Irish and the 57th, 122nd and 156th French divisions crossing the border. Greek border guards assured the Allies that they would oppose any Bulgarian attempt to cross. An Allied spy later confirmed that Bulgaria had no intent of breaching the border, instead halting  short.

Analysis
The battle was a clear, albeit incomplete victory for the Central Powers. As a consequence they opened the railway line from Berlin to Constantinople, allowing Germany to prop up its weaker partner, the Ottoman Empire. Despite the Central Powers' victory, the Allies managed to save a part of the Serbian Army, which although battered, seriously reduced and almost unarmed, escaped total destruction and after reorganizing resumed operations six months later. The Allies—using the moral excuse of saving the Serbian Army—managed to replace the impossible Serbian front with a viable one established in Macedonia (albeit by violating the territory of Greece, a neutral country); a front which would prove key to their final victory three years later. The Allies were able to concentrate on fortifying the so-called Entrenched Camp, in preparation for a large scale Bulgarian invasion of Greece and an impending assault on Salonika.

Casualties
The battle at Kosturino and the subsequent evacuation of the Allies resulted in 1,209 British casualties, including 99 killed, 386 wounded, 724 missing and 10 artillery pieces. French casualties amounted to 1,804 killed, wounded or missing, as well as 12 machine guns and 36 ammunition wagons. The number of Bulgarian losses during the battle are estimated to vastly greater than that of the Allies, with at least 400 falling dead on 9 December.

Subsequent operations
Following the failure of the August Offensive at the Dardanelles, the Gallipoli Campaign drifted into stalemate. Ottoman success began to affect public opinion in the United Kingdom, with news discrediting Ian Standish Monteith Hamilton's performance being smuggled out by journalists like Keith Murdoch and Ellis Ashmead-Bartlett. General Stopford also contributed to the overall air of gloom. The prospect of evacuation was raised on 11 October 1915 but Hamilton resisted the suggestion, fearing the damage to British prestige. He was dismissed as commander shortly afterwards and replaced by Lieutenant General Sir Charles Monro. Autumn and winter brought relief from the heat but also led to gales, blizzards and flooding, resulting in men drowning and freezing to death, while thousands suffered frostbite. After consulting with the commanders of VIII Corps at Helles, IX Corps at Suvla, and Anzac, Sir Herbert Kitchener agreed with Monro and the British Cabinet in early December, confirmed the decision to evacuate.

Suvla and Anzac were to be evacuated in late December, the last troops leaving before dawn on 20 December. Troop numbers had been slowly reduced since the 7 December and ruses, such as William Scurry's self-firing rifle, which had been rigged to fire by water dripped into a pan attached to the trigger, were used to disguise the Allied departure. At Anzac Cove, troops maintained silence for an hour or more, until curious Ottoman troops ventured to inspect the trenches, whereupon the Anzacs opened fire. The final British troops departed from Lancashire Landing around 04:00 on 8 January 1916. The Newfoundland Regiment was chosen to be a part of the rearguard, finally withdrawing from Gallipoli on 9 January 1916.

See also

 Kingdom of Yugoslavia

Notes
Footnotes

Citations

References

 
 
 
 
 
 
 
 
 
 
 
 
 
 

Krivolak
Krivolak
Krivolak
1915 in Serbia
Conflicts in 1915
Macedonian front
Vardar Macedonia (1912–1918)
Military history of North Macedonia
October 1915 events
November 1915 events